William Roy Johnson (March 19, 1947 – April 22, 2005) was an American competition swimmer.

Johnson represented the United States at the 1968 Summer Olympics in Mexico City.  He swam for the gold medal-winning U.S. teams in the qualifying heats of the men's 4×100-meter freestyle relay and men's 4×200-meter freestyle relay.  He did not, however, receive a medal for either event because only relay swimmers who competed in the event final were eligible to receive a medal under the 1968 swimming rules.

Johnson attended the University of Southern California (USC), and swam for the USC Trojans swimming and diving team in National Collegiate Athletic Association (NCAA) competition from 1967 to 1968. Previously he swam for Fullerton College in 65 & 66.  He was recognized as an All-American four times as a college swimmer.

See also
 List of University of Southern California people

References

1947 births
2005 deaths
American male freestyle swimmers
Olympic swimmers of the United States
Swimmers from Santa Monica, California
Swimmers at the 1968 Summer Olympics
USC Trojans men's swimmers